Cris Kajd (born September 9, 1951 in Norrköping) is a Swedish sport shooter. She competed in pistol shooting events at the Summer Olympics in 1984, 1988, and 1992.

Olympic results

References

1951 births
Living people
ISSF pistol shooters
Swedish female sport shooters
Shooters at the 1984 Summer Olympics
Shooters at the 1988 Summer Olympics
Shooters at the 1992 Summer Olympics
Olympic shooters of Sweden
Sportspeople from Norrköping